The Māori people have had a strong and changing conservation ethic from the time of their discovery and settlement of New Zealand until the present day. This is closely tied to their spiritual beliefs.

Māori settlement
The Maori people first arrived in New Zealand in 950 AD. At the time, the biodiversity of New Zealand was much greater than the current state with the only mammals being three species of bats. As a result, a large and diverse bird population inhabited the forests of the land. The largest known species of eagle, Haast's eagle, was native to the South Island. The impact of the Maori people had an adverse impact on the land. They hunted the flightless moa to extinction and cleared large swathes of forests, both to make way for settlements and to light fires in order to more easily hunt birds. Approximately half the native forests of New Zealand were destroyed within the first several hundred years. Without their primary foodsource (the moa) Haast's Eagle became extinct sometime in the 15th century. The Maori people also introduced the Polynesian Rat to New Zealand, which was devastating for the local bird populations. It is likely that the rats were brought as a food source by Maori settlers, but escaped and soon infested the island. This was especially harmful to the avian species of New Zealand which had evolved with no behavioural defence against the rats, as they had few, if any, natural predators.
 
The Maori's daily life was dictated by the season. The planting season was in October and the harvest in February. The trapping of rats and birds was commonly practised by the forest tribes. Despite a relatively small population, the tribes claimed ownership of the entire island, periodically visiting land to substantiate claims. For the Maori, the land was not merely a resource, but a connection to ancestors. The mana of the tribe was strongly associated with the lands of that tribe. From this came the Maori proverb "Man perishes, but the land remains." The Maori beliefs included Atua, invisible spirits connected to natural phenomena such as rainbows, trees, or stones. Sacred pools were known as wai tapu. It is the policy of the New Zealand Green Party to return wai tapu to the iwi, as some are currently under control of the Conservation Estate. Large number of New Zealand pigeons flocking to feed on the fruit of the toromiro is an indicator of the mana of the forest. Because of this, this bird is generally only hunted for special occasions; the feathers are worn by Maori women of high social status.

Rāhui is a form of protection of natural resources that Maori implemented as a conservation measure as well as for other reasons.

Contemporary viewpoints
A Cultural Health Index for waterways has been developed that links Western science and the cultural knowledge of the Māori about stream health.

Maori belief dictates that Tane, the god of forest and birds, created the first man.

In Maori society, special status is granted to those known as the tangata whenua 'people of the land', or Maori who have resided in the local district for many generations. This is in contrast with the Maori that have no ancestral connection to the land, known variously as tangata haere mai 'people who have come in', rawaho 'outsiders' or tauiwi 'foreigners'. Depending on the remoteness of the community, the percentage of tangate haere mai can vary from as few as 5% to in excess of 70%. Today, the term tangata whenua is often used to broadly differentiate between Māori and other groups.

Another important aspect of the Maori's relationship with nature was the concept of tapu, a dangerous energy that had to be properly nullified through ritual. Every natural resource had this, meaning, at least in theory, that exploitation of natural resources was limited by tapu.

Maori land laws, which dictate equal partitioning of inheritances among children, have had the effect of preserving the land by making individual land blocks too small for economic use. Compounded with this, Maori of the older generation are culturally disinclined to sell their shares to developers, making cutting firewood or cultivating small gardens the primary economic activity on these lands.

Maori blame European prohibition laws, many of which were implemented during the colonial era, for usurping the mana and contributing to the declining biodiversity of New Zealand.  In particular, Maori pointed to the continuing decline of the New Zealand Pigeon in spite of prohibitions on hunting, claiming Tane was removing them as they were no longer being used by the people. Regaining responsibility for the environment of New Zealand is seen not only as important from a conservation standpoint, but critical to truly be tangata whenua.

Māori ecological knowledge 
A team of researchers studied Maori traditional ecological knowledge of the tuatara, a reptile native to New Zealand through oral questioning of elders. This is particularly important because the tuatara is a living fossil, being the last living member of its taxonomic order. The tuatara had become extinct on the main island and exists only on 37 offshore islands. The elders' testimony correctly matched existing scientific knowledge regarding the physiology, diet, range, and behavior. The researchers concluded that, "In at least some cases, traditional ecological knowledge may persist as species decline and may serve as a valuable source of ecological information for conservation." In addition, they discovered seven more sites that the tuatara inhabited in recent times from this testimony.

Culturally, the tuatara are generally considered a bad omen, though 20% of elders report tuatara being kept as pets. Tuatara, which have a primitive "third eye" and a long natural lifespan, are believed to have great knowledge and ability to see hidden things. Conversely, elders of the Ngai Wai Iwi report putting the reptiles under their shirts to stay cool. In the paper, Ramstad concludes,  "Our current understanding of Maori attitudes toward tuatara needs revising to accommodate this heterogeneity in traditional ecological knowledge. Not all Maori fear tuatara, not all iwi subsisted historically on tuatara, and the cultural role of tuatara differs over time and among iwi."

Legal status of geographic locations 
Today, approximately one third of New Zealand is under the mandate of the Department of Conservation. Whanganui River was recognized as having the same legal status as a person by the government of New Zealand in 2017, ending the country's longest running litigation, which had begun 160 years ago. Prior to European settlement, the river was important for being easily navigable, which allowed widespread settlements through the Whanganui River valley. Prior to European colonization, this region was the most densely populated on the North Island. Regarding this status, the lead negotiator for the Whanganui Tribe, Gerrard Albert, stated “The reason we have taken this approach is because we consider the river an ancestor and always have... We can trace our genealogy to the origins of the universe, and therefore rather than us being masters of the natural world, we are part of it." Two legal guardians, one from the tribe and one from the New Zealand government, were appointed. A Maori MP, Adtian Rurawhe, stated that, "From a Whanganui viewpoint the wellbeing of the river is directly linked to the well-being of the people," referring to the mana of the tangata whenua.

Mount Taranki was granted similar legal status later in 2017, with eight tribes and the New Zealand government acting as legal guardians. The Minister for treaty negotiations, Andrew Little, said of the decision, "Today’s agreements are a major milestone in acknowledging the grievances and hurt from the past as the Taranaki iwi experienced some of the worst examples of Crown behaviour in the 19th century". Albert hoped that these decisions would set a precedent for other Maori tribes to grant legal personhood to geographic locations. Part of what is now Tongariro National Park was given to The Crown by the Maori chief Te Heuheu Tukino IV to ensure its protection.

Haka Kererū 
The Haka Kererū was a ceremonial dance that "served to make the connection between the environment and the people, and points to the fundamental platform of life and existence—Papatūānuku (Mother Earth)". During its last recorded performance in 1972, "huahua (preserved kererū)" was served. The haka references the ecological devastation caused by European colonists. The exact words vary as individuals tailored them to their own dialects:

An alternative version also exists.

See also 

Conservation in New Zealand
List of conservation issues
Environmental movement in New Zealand
Mana
Māori people

References

Further reading

External links
Te Ara - the Encyclopedia of New Zealand - Simon Nathan. Conservation – a history

Nature conservation in New Zealand
Conservation, Maori and
Māori science